The Idol is an upcoming American drama television series created by Abel "The Weeknd" Tesfaye, Reza Fahim, and Sam Levinson for HBO. It is set to star Lily-Rose Depp and Tesfaye in the leading roles, with Suzanna Son, Troye Sivan, Moses Sumney, Jane Adams, Dan Levy, Jennie Kim, Eli Roth, Rachel Sennott, Hari Nef, Da'Vine Joy Randolph, Mike Dean, Ramsey, and Hank Azaria appearing as supporting characters. The series will also mark the final television appearance of Anne Heche, who died on August 11, 2022.

Synopsis
The show will center on Jocelyn (Lily-Rose Depp), an aspiring pop idol who, after having a nervous breakdown that causes her last tour to be canceled, resolves to reclaim her title as the sexiest pop star in America and begins a complicated relationship with a self-help guru and the head of a contemporary cult (The Weeknd).

Cast and characters

Main

Recurring

Production

Development 
On June 29, 2021, Abel "The Weeknd" Tesfaye announced that he would be creating, executive producing and co-writing a drama series for HBO alongside Reza Fahim and Sam Levinson. On the same day, Ashley Levinson and Joseph Epstein were announced as executive producers for the series, with Epstein also serving as a writer and the series' showrunner. Mary Laws was also announced as a writer and will serve as a co-executive producer, alongside Tesfaye's co-manager Wassim Slaiby and his creative director La Mar Taylor. Amy Seimetz was signed on as the director and as an executive producer.

On November 22, HBO gave the production a series order for a first season consisting of six episodes. On January 14, 2022, Deadline Hollywood reported that Nick Hall had joined the production as an executive producer, following his move to A24 to oversee creative for the company's television slate.

Casting 
In the initial announcement, Tesfaye revealed that he would be starring in the series. On September 29, 2021, it was reported that Lily-Rose Depp had signed on to play the female lead opposite Tesfaye. On November 22, Suzanna Son, Steve Zissis, and Troye Sivan joined the main cast, while Melanie Liburd, Tunde Adebimpe, Elizabeth Berkley, Nico Hiraga and Anne Heche were announced as recurring characters. On December 2, Juliebeth Gonzalez joined the cast as a series regular, while Maya Eshet, Tyson Ritter, Kate Lyn Sheil, Liz Caribel Sierra and Finley Rose Slater were cast in recurring roles. 

On April 25, 2022, Variety reported that the show was set to undergo a major overhaul, with "drastic" changes in the cast and creative directions. On April 27, Deadline Hollywood reported that Son, Zissis and Gonzalez were not expected to return. In July, actors Rachel Sennott and Hari Nef along with Blackpink's member Jennie Ruby Jane (in her acting debut), joined the cast;  Moses Sumney, Jane Adams, Dan Levy, Eli Roth, Da'Vine Joy Randolph, Mike Dean, Ramsey, and Hank Azaria were confirmed as cast members on August 21 in the second teaser trailer. On March 1, 2023, Rolling Stone reported that Son and Sivan remained in the cast despite the overhaul.

Filming 
Principal photography began in November 2021 in and around Los Angeles, California. Production was temporarily paused in April 2022 due to Tesfaye co-headlining the Coachella Valley Music and Arts Festival with Swedish House Mafia on short notice. On April 25, Variety reported that Seimetz had left the project amid its creative overhaul, with roughly 80% of the series already filmed. HBO released a statement following Seimetz's exit, saying: "The Idols creative team continues to build, refine, and evolve their vision for the show and they have aligned on a new creative direction. The production will be adjusting its cast and crew accordingly to best serve this new approach to the series. We look forward to sharing more information soon." 

Levinson reportedly took over Seimetz's directing duties. According to IndieWire and other sources, Tesfaye wanted to tone down the "cult" aspect of the story, and felt concerned that the show was "leaning too much into a female perspective." Levinson embarked on a reshoot and rewrite of the series, scrapping Seimetz's approach to the story — a troubled starlet falling victim to a predatory industry figure and fighting to reclaim her own agency — to instead depict a love story, with a heavier emphasis on sexual content and nudity.

Production resumed in late May 2022 and was paused again in early July, just as Tesfaye began embarking on his After Hours til Dawn Tour. Scenes from The Idol were filmed in September at SoFi Stadium in Inglewood, California during Tesfaye's tour. Audience members were notified of the filming before the concert commenced.

Release

The Idol is reported to premiere out of competition at the 76th Cannes Film Festival in May 2023.

References

External links 
 
 Official site

Upcoming drama television series
2020s American drama television series
HBO original programming
English-language television shows
Television series about cults
Television series by A24
Television shows filmed in Los Angeles
Works about the music industry
The Weeknd
Television series by Home Box Office